Jetboy is an American, San Francisco-based, hard rock band, founded in 1983 by guitarists Billy Rowe and Fernie Rod. Jetboy got the attention of music fans and record executives alike in Hollywood during the mid-1980s. The band transplanted themselves to Los Angeles in 1986 after signing a deal with Elektra Records. Their musical influences ranged from punk rock to rock 'n' roll to blues. Their 1988 debut album Feel the Shake peaked at 135 on Billboard 200.

After parting ways with original bass player Todd Crew in mid-1987, the band was joined by former Hanoi Rocks member Sami Yaffa. Yaffa, a member of one of the groups Jetboy had found most influential, was now a member of the band as their new bassist. In July 1987, Todd Crew died due to a drug overdose in the hotel room of Guns N' Roses guitarist Slash. Jetboy continued on into the 1990s before disbanding in 1992. However, over a decade later, Jetboy reconvened, toured and recorded a new EP, Off Your Rocker in 2010. Having been absent from the studio for some 20 years, Jetboy recorded Off Your Rocker in a fully organic mode. The band played all in the same room together in a "live-style" format in an effort to duplicate the way the songs were written, all together, in a 1970s fashion in which the band could feed off of one anothers' energy.

Jetboy has continued to gain in popularity, and has continuously played to large crowds at festivals across the United States including Rocklahoma, The South Texas Rock Fest, Rock the Bayou and the M3 Festival twice.

On June 1, 2012, Jetboy did a 25-year reunion for their debut album 'Feel The Shake' at the Whisky a Go Go in Hollywood. The show was also a release party for the movie Rock of Ages which featured a few images of Jetboy. The line-up for this show included all original members with a surprise appearance by their second bass player Sami Yaffa who is currently playing in the Michael Monroe Band. This was the first time they all shared the stage together in over 20 years. Jetboy continued with the original line-up with Charles Norman on bass, who had replaced Yaffa, for the Damnednation tour in 1989.

On January 25, 2014, during NAMM weekend Jetboy supported Faster Pussycat at the Whisky A Go-Go to a sold-out crowd to celebrate the club's 50-year anniversary. The band performed at Riki Rachtman's Cathouse Live on August 15, 2015, at the Irvine Meadows Amphitheater in Irvine, California.

Three songs from Feel the Shake were featured in the 1989 movie The 'Burbs, starring Tom Hanks. They were "Bloodstone", "Locked in a Cage" and "Make Some Noise". Additionally, two songs from Feel the Shake, "Feel the Shake" and "Make Some Noise" were also featured in the 1989 movie She's Out of Control.

"Feel the Shake" was the goal celebration song of the NHL's Philadelphia Flyers from 2019-20 through 2021.

The group's most recent album, Born to Fly, was released January 25, 2019, through Frontiers Records.

Members 
Current
 Mickey Finn – vocals, harmonica, tambourine (1983–1993, 2006–2010, 2010–present)
 Billy Rowe – rhythm and slide guitar, backing vocals (1983–1993, 2006–present)
 Fernie Rod – lead and rhythm guitar, backing vocals (1983–1993, 2006–present)
 Al Serrato – drums (2015–present)
 Eric Stacy – bass guitar (2016–present)

Former
 Ron Tostenson – drums, backing vocals (1983–1992, 2006–2007, 2010–2015)
 Todd Crew – bass guitar, backing vocals (1983–1987; died 1987)
 Sami Yaffa – bass guitar, backing vocals (1987–1990)
 Charles Norman – bass guitar (1990–1991, 2010)
 Bill Fraenza – bass guitar, backing vocals (1991–1993)
 Rick Davis – drums (1992–1993)
 Michael Butler – bass guitar (2006–2009)
 Paul Scavuzzo – drums (2006)
 Tim Huthert – drums (2007)
 Jeff Moscone – drums (2007–2008)
 Doug Hovan – drums (2008–2009)
 D.K. Revelle – vocals (2010)
 Jesus Mendez Jr. – drums (2010–2012)
 Jessie Farnsworth – bass (2010–2012)

Discography

Studio albums
 Feel the Shake (1988)
 Damned Nation (1990)
 A Day in the Glamorous Life (1998)
 Make Some More Noise (1999)
 One More for Rock N' Roll (2002)
 Off Your Rocker (2010)
 Born to Fly (2019)

Compilation albums
 Lost & Found (1999)
 Now and Then (2007)

Live DVDs
 The Glam Years - Movie and CD (2007)

References

External links 
Official Website

Jetboy at Yahoo! Music

American glam rock musical groups
Hard rock musical groups from California
Musical groups established in 1983